Abdul Hai Baloch, also known as Abdul Hayee Baloch (1 February 1946 – 25 February 2022), was a Pakistani social and political activist from Balochistan.

Early life and education
Baloch was born on 1 February 1946 in the Chhalgari District Bolan in the Balochistan province of Pakistan. He received an MBBS from Dow Medical college.

Political career 
He was elected as the member of  National Assembly of Pakistan in 1970s. Baloch was the prominent and one of the founding leaders of  Balochistan National Movement and later became the president of the National Party. He later formed his own political party known as National Democratic Party (NDP) in 2018.

Awards and honours
Baloch received the Jalib Peace Award 2016 given by the Arts Council of Pakistan.

Personal life and death
He died in a traffic collision on 25 February 2022, at the age of 76.

See also 
 National Awami Party
 Baloch Students Organization
 Communist Party of Pakistan

References

1946 births
2022 deaths
Baloch nationalists
Baloch people
Baloch Students Organization
National Party (Pakistan) politicians
People from Kachhi District
Pakistani MNAs 1972–1977